Jackman Music is a sheet music publishing company that is based in Bountiful, Utah. They specialize in publishing Latter-day Saint themed religious music for choirs, pianists, organists, and a variety of instrumentalists.

Jackman Music was founded by Jerry and Carole Jackman in 1975 and has since grown to become the leading publisher of LDS print music, publishing over 1800 individual titles.

See also
Mormon folk music
Mormon music
Music of Utah

Sources

External links
Jackman Music homepage
Jackman Music at the Deseret News business database
Jackman Music at bizfind.us
Jerry Jackman Interview - NAMM Oral History Library (2010)

Companies based in Orem, Utah
Music retailers of the United States
Publishing companies established in 1975
Sheet music publishing companies
1975 establishments in Utah
American companies established in 1975